Sam Riffice (born 1 March 1999) is an American tennis player.

Early life and career
His mother, Lori Riffice, is a national coach with USTA Player Development. The family relocated to Central Florida to be a part of the USTA National Campus staff when it first opened in January 2017.

Whilst studying at the University of Florida Riffice won the 2021 SEC championship. Riffice then won the 2021 NCAA Singles Tournament at the USTA National Campus where as the No. 6-seed Riffice defeated No. 2-seeded Daniel Rodrigues of South Carolina by a score of 3–6, 6–1, 6–4 in the final. He was also captain of the Florida Gators as they won the 2021 NCAA team title.

Career
Riffice was given his ATP tour debut as a wildcard at the 2021 US Open, where he lost in the first round to 15th seed Grigor Dimitrov.

ATP Challenger and ITF Futures finals

Singles: 6 (2–4)

References

1999 births
Living people
American male tennis players
Tennis people from California
Florida Gators men's tennis players
20th-century American people
21st-century American people